Nord 3.606 to 3.787 were 0-6-0 locomotives for mixed traffic of the Chemins de Fer du Nord.
The machines were the continuation of the Nord 265 to 274 (3.265–3.274) Mammouth locomotives of 1849, and hence were also referred to by the same nickname.
They were retired from service from 1910 until end of 1930.

Construction history

The first series, Nord 3.621–3.660, dated back to 1860.
Regarding the dimensions and disposition of the frame and drivetrain it was derived from the preceding Nord 265 to 274 Mammouth locomotives of 1849.
Contrary to the 1849 type the machines were fitted with a Crampton-type boiler and firebox.
The firebox extended over the rear driving axle and the boiler consisted of three shells.
A Crampton steam regulator was mounted at the front and the steam pipes were routed down to the cylinders on the outside of the boiler.
The two cylinders were mounted inside the frame in an inclined position and had a Stephenson valve gear.

The next series, Nord 3.663–3.697, was put into service in 1866–1867.

The machines of the next series, Nord 3.698–3.747, had an increased power output.
They were built in 1875–1878 and had a  Belpaire firebox and boiler with the dome on the rear boiler shell.
The leaf spring of the rear axle suspension had been moved down below the firebox and the cylinder size increased to 

The last series, built in 1882 and comprising Nord 3.606–3.620 and Nord 3.748–3.787, was built with vacuum brake and cab.

In 1880 four locomotives, Nord 3.621, 3.630, 3.634 and 3.639, were transformed to tank-locomotives for tram service.

Service history
The locomotives were used for mixed service on the main lines of the Chemins de Fer du Nord, as well as on less important lines, and later were used for local passenger trains, mixed service, freight trains and shunting.
The last locomotives in service, the Nord 3.685, 3.714, 3.718, 3.732, 3.745 and 3.774, were removed from service with 30 December 1930.

References

Bibliography

External links

 ETH-Bibliothek Zürich, Bildarchiv. Schneider & Cie Le Creusot, 1874, Nord 3.732, viewer

Steam locomotives of France
3.606
0-6-0 locomotives
Railway locomotives introduced in 1860
Schneider locomotives
SACM locomotives
C n2 locomotives